The Oceania Football Confederation (OFC) is one of the six continental confederations of international association football. The OFC has 13 members, 11 of which are full members and two which are associate members not affiliated with FIFA. It promotes the game in Oceania and allows the member nations to qualify for the FIFA World Cup.

OFC is predominantly made up of island nations where association football is not the most popular sport, with low GDP and low population meaning very little money is generated by the OFC nations. The OFC has little influence in the wider football world, either in terms of international competition or as a source of players for high-profile club competitions. OFC is the only confederation to have not had at least one international title, the best result being Australia making the final of the 1997 FIFA Confederations Cup.

In 2006, the OFC's largest and most successful nation, Australia, left to join the Asian Football Confederation, leaving New Zealand as the largest federation within the OFC.

The President of OFC is Lambert Maltock since April 2018. The Vice Presidents are Thierry Ariiotima, Kapi Natto John and Lord Ve'ehala while Franck Castillo is the General Secretary. The confederation is headquartered in Auckland, New Zealand.

History
The confederation formed in 1966, as a result of Australia and New Zealand's failed attempts to join the Asian Football Confederation (AFC). The founding OFC members were the following:
 the Australian Soccer Federation (from 2005: Football Australia)
 New Zealand Soccer (subsequently New Zealand Football)
 the Fiji Football Association
 the Papua New Guinea Football Association

Australia resigned as an OFC member in 1972 to again pursue membership with the AFC, but rejoined the OFC in 1978. Their men's national team (nicknamed the Socceroos) became the first Oceanians to play at a FIFA World Cup in 1974, being drawn in the same group as Chile, East Germany and West Germany. They failed to score a goal, but were still competitive in all three of their matches. New Zealand's national team the All Whites played in their first World Cup eight years later. At the 1982 tournament they suffered heavier defeats than Australia previously had.

Chinese Taipei was an OFC member from 1975 to 1989. In 1996, FIFA confirmed OFC as a full confederation and granted it a seat on the FIFA executive. In 1998 the OFC unveiled a new logo and an official magazine, entitled The Wave. Australia meanwhile lost several inter-confederation World Cup playoffs; first to Scotland in 1985, then Argentina in 1993 and then Iran in 1997.

Australia's national team were long considered the biggest challenge in Oceania. There were many highly uncompetitive matches involving them, particularly in the 1990s and 2000s. Their June 1997 second round qualification games for the 1998 FIFA World Cup included a 13–0 defeat of the Solomon Islands. The following year they defeated the Cook Islands 16–0 at the 1998 OFC Nations Cup, while at the 2000 OFC Nations Cup they defeated them 17–0. The uncompetitive results escalated in April 2001, during the first round of OFC qualifiers for the 2002 FIFA World Cup. Australia beat Tonga 22–0, following this result up with a 31–0 defeat of American Samoa and an 11–0 defeat of Samoa. The American Samoa game became the largest international victory in the history of the sport (breaking the previous record set in the Tonga game), while Archie Thompson also broke the record for most goals in an international match, scoring 13.

Australia's record-breaking form in the early stages of qualifying ultimately couldn't be replicated in their inter-confederation playoff against Uruguay later that year. For the first leg, the Socceroos managed to defeat the South Americans 1–0 in front of a Melbourne crowd of 84,656, but they were overwhelmed 3–0 in the away leg. The away leg was marred by an incident at Montevideo's airport prior to the game itself, where the Australian players were spat on, punched and abused by a mob of Uruguayan fans. On 24 May 2004, New Caledonia became the 12th member of the OFC.

Australia reached another inter-confederation playoff against Uruguay in 2005. Both sides won a game each over the two legs, which led to Australia finally ending their World Cup drought through a dramatic penalty shootout in Sydney. The Socceroos were granted increased security for the first away leg, as a response to the 2001 airport incident, and in the second leg the Uruguayan team were heavily booed while their national anthem played. In the 2006 FIFA World Cup, Australia were eliminated by Italy during the Round of 16. Their 3–1 group stage victory against Japan remains the only time a team representing OFC has won at the tournament. Australia left the OFC again that same year and joined the Asian Football Confederation.

In 2008, an associate member, the Northern Mariana Islands Football Association, also left the OFC and in 2009 joined the AFC as an associate member. In late 2009, the Palau Football Association, geographically a part of Oceania but with no official ties to the OFC, also applied for the same status with the AFC as the Northern Mariana Islands association but was not successful. New Zealand ended their own World Cup drought in 2009 when they defeated Bahrain to qualify for the 2010 FIFA World Cup. The tournament coincidentally also featured Australia, who were now representing the AFC. New Zealand were the only unbeaten team at the tournament, despite failing to advance past the group stage. With Australia's absence, New Zealand now have a regular presence in World Cup inter-confederation playoffs. They were convincingly defeated by Mexico over two legs in 2013, and narrowly missed out to Peru in 2017 and Costa Rica in 2022.

Criticism
Throughout its history, there have been numerous calls to either merge the OFC and AFC, or dissolve the OFC and have its members join the AFC, in order to form an Asia-Pacific Football Confederation.

The calls grew louder in 2003 when FIFA reversed a decision to grant Oceania an automatic spot at the World Cup. Australia's lack of World Cup participation prior to 2006 has been blamed by many on the OFC qualification process, with football writer Matthew Hall stating in 2003, "For World Cup qualification, the Socceroos will win games by cricket scores and then face a sudden-death play-off against a desperate, battle-hardened opponent given a second, or even third, life."

Presidents

Current leaders 

Source:

Member nations

Current members
OFC is made up of 11 full member associations and 2 associate members. Those two are associate members of the OFC, but are not FIFA members.

Notes

Possible future members 
 Autonomous Region of Bougainville: The Autonomous Region of Bougainville is set to gain full independence from Papua New Guinea by 2027. The president of the Bougainville Football Federation, Justin Helele, expressed the association's desire to join FIFA and, presumably, the OFC. FIFA has already begun funding projects in the territory. The Melanesian region has also participated in OFC projects and has received funding from the confederation since at least 2012. That year the OFC began youth football programs. The next year, the OFC helped fund the creation of a football academy in Bougainville.
 Federated States of Micronesia: The Federated States of Micronesia were announced as new associate members of the OFC following the 2006 Extraordinary Congress. It is unclear when they were removed from the association. In 2010 the Federated States of Micronesia Football Association submitted an application to the East Asian Football Federation in hopes of taking the steps to join FIFA. However, the application was not successful. In 2017 Englishman Paul Watson who was connected to the association said, "I think it’s starting to look like Micronesia is best off looking to Oceania rather than Asia. I don’t see any reason why they shouldn’t get into OFC within the next year or two, but it’ll all depend on the people inside the organization."
 Marshall Islands: The Marshall Islands Soccer Association was created in 2020. The organization’s goal is to join the regional and world governing bodies “in the coming years.”  The association has indicated that the nation may field its first-ever national soccer team at the 2023 Micronesian Games hosted by the country.
 Nauru: Nauru is one of the few fully-sovereign nations that is not a member of FIFA or a regional confederation. The Nauru Soccer Federation has reportedly applied for membership in both the OFC and FIFA but was denied. In 2009 the Nauruan Minister of Sport Rayong Itsimaera indicated that there were challenges preventing them from joining both bodies, presumably the lack of a league system and a preference for Australian rules football by the population. Nauru has been participating in some OFC initiatives since at least 2020.
 Niue: Niue is a former associate member of the OFC. Following the Niue Island Soccer Association's removal from the OFC and its subsequent disbandment in 2021, an OFC official indicated that they were aware of the formation of the new Niue Football Association and welcomed its application for associate membership.
 Palau: The Palau Football Association has been a member of the OFC in the past, being announced as a new member at the organization's 2006 Extraordinary Congress, alongside the Federated States of Micronesia. In 2009 the association asked to join the East Asian Football Federation, a sub-regional body under the Asian Football Confederation.

Several other sovereign states, associated states, dependencies, and territories in Oceania, including members of the United Nations, have no affiliations to confederations. Some play infrequently while others have been inactive for several years. There are also some which do not have a national team at all.
  (external territory of Australia)
  (overseas territory of the United Kingdom)
  (dependent territory of New Zealand)
  (overseas collectivity of France)

Former members

Note
Israel entered the FIFA World Cup OFC qualifying tournaments in 1986 and 1990 due to political reasons, though it never became a formal OFC member.

Non-members

AFC Members 
Three FIFA members geographically in Oceania are not affiliated with the OFC but are instead members of FIFA's Asian Football Confederation:

CONIFA Members 
Three CONIFA members are geographically in Oceania but not affiliated with the OFC nor FIFA:

  Hawaiʻi

Competitions

National teams
Men's
OFC Nations Cup
OFC U-23 Championship
OFC U-20 Championship
OFC U-17 Championship
OFC Futsal Championship
OFC Youth Futsal Tournament
OFC Beach Soccer Championship

Women's
OFC Women's Nations Cup
OFC U-20 Women's Championship
OFC U-17 Women's Championship

League
The OFC Professional League is a region-wide league currently being planned for an inaugural season in 2025 with support from FIFA.

Clubs
Men's
OFC Champions League
OFC Futsal Champions League

Former tournaments
National teams
OFC Men's Olympic Qualifying Tournament
OFC Women's Olympic Qualifying Tournament

Clubs
Oceania Cup Winners' Cup
OFC President's Cup

Current title holders

FIFA World Rankings

Overview

Historical leaders

Men's

Team of the Year

Major tournament records
Legend
  – Champion
  – Runner-up
  – Third place
  – Fourth place
QF – Quarter-finals (1934–1938, 1954–1970, and 1986–present: knockout round of 8)
R2 – Round 2 (1974–1978, second group stage, top 8; 1982: second group stage, top 12; 1986–2022: knockout round of 16)
R1 – Round 1 (1930, 1950–1970 and 1986–present: group stage; 1934–1938: knockout round of 16; 1974–1982: first group stage)
  — Did not qualify
  — Did not enter / withdrawn / banned / disqualified
  — Hosts

For each tournament, the flag of the host country and the number of teams in each finals tournament (in brackets) are shown.

FIFA World Cup

Oceania has sent representatives to the FIFA World Cup four times: Australia in 1974 and 2006, and New Zealand in 1982 and 2010. Of these, only Australia in 2006 progressed beyond the first round.

The OFC is the only FIFA confederation that does not have a guaranteed spot in the World Cup finals (a major reason for the Australians leaving the confederation in 2006 to join Asia). Between 1966 and 1982, OFC teams joined the Asian zone qualification tournament, while from 1986 onwards, the winners of the Oceanian zone qualification tournament have to enter the intercontinental play-offs against teams from other confederations in order to gain a spot in the FIFA World Cup.

Beginning in 2026, the OFC will have a guaranteed spot in the FIFA World Cup for the first time in history, result of the competition's expansion from 32 to 48 teams.

OFC play-off record
1970 AFC–OFC Final Round

1974 AFC–OFC Final Round

1986 UEFA–OFC play-off

1990 CONMEBOL–OFC play-off

Israel played in the OFC zone for political reasons.

1994 CONCACAF–OFC play-off

1994 CONMEBOL–OFC play-off

1998 AFC–OFC play-off

2002 CONMEBOL–OFC play-off

2006 CONMEBOL–OFC play-off

2010 AFC–OFC play-off

2014 CONCACAF–OFC play-off

2018 CONMEBOL–OFC play-off

2022 CONCACAF–OFC play-off

FIFA Women's World Cup

Olympic Games For Men

Olympic Games For Women

OFC Nations Cup

OFC Women's Nations Cup

Notes
</onlyinclude>

FIFA U-20 World Cup

FIFA U-20 Women's World Cup

FIFA U-17 World Cup

FIFA U-17 Women's World Cup

FIFA Futsal World Cup

FIFA Beach Soccer World Cup

Notes

Former tournaments

FIFA Confederations Cup

Notes

See also

Oceania association football club records and statistics
International Federation of Association Football (FIFA)
Asian Football Confederation (AFC)
Confederation of African Football (CAF)
Confederation of North, Central America and Caribbean Association Football (CONCACAF)
Confederation of South American Football (CONMEBOL)
Union of European Football Associations (UEFA)
List of association football competitions

References

External links
Official website 
Oceania Football Confederation, SoccerLens.com. Retrieved: 10 September 2010.

 
Foot
 
FIFA confederations
1966 establishments in Oceania
Sports organizations established in 1966